The Itaipava São Paulo Indy 300 presented by Nestlé was the fourth race of the 2013 IZOD IndyCar Series season. The race took place on May 5, 2013, on the  temporary street circuit in São Paulo, Brazil, and was telecasted by the NBC Sports Network in the United States.

Canadian James Hinchcliffe won the race, his second win of the season, by passing Takuma Sato, winner of the previous race in Long Beach, on the final corner of the final lap.

Report

Background

Report

Classification

Starting grid

Race results

Notes
 Points include 1 point for leading at least 1 lap during a race, an additional 2 points for leading the most race laps, and 1 point for Pole Position.

Standings after the race

 Note: Only the top ten positions are included.

External links

Sao Paulo Indy 300
São Paulo Indy 300
Sao Paulo Indy 300